Sumichrast's vesper rat (Nyctomys sumichrasti) is a rodent of the family Cricetidae found from southern Mexico to Panama. It is named for François Sumichrast, the collector of the first specimen, and its closest relative is probably Hatt's vesper rat, a similar, but slightly smaller, species from the Yucatán Peninsula.

Description
It is one of the more brightly coloured rats, with a reddish or orange back and creamy to white underparts. The rats have a thick pelt of soft fur, which extends over the entire length of the tail, and is absent only on the soles of the feet. The eyes are relatively large, and surrounded by a narrow ring of black hair, while the whiskers are long and the ears small.

To aid in climbing, the claws are compressed and curved, and the first toe on each foot is thumb-like.

Distribution and subspecies
Sumichrast's vesper rat is found from southern Jalisco and Veracruz in Mexico through much of Central America, excluding the Yucatan, as far east as central Panama. A total of nine subspecies are currently recognised:

 N. s. sumichrasti - southern Veracruz, Mexico
 N. s. colimensis - Jalisco to Oaxaca, Mexico
 N. s. costaricensis - southern Costa Rica
 N. s. decolorus - southern Belize and eastern Guatemala to Honduras
 N. s. florencei - southern Honduras and western Nicaragua
 N. s. nitellinus - eastern Costa Rica to central Panama
 N. s. pallidulus - southern Tabasco and western Chiapas
 N. s. salvini - eastern Chiapas and southern Guatemala
 N. s. venustulus - eastern Nicaragua

Biology and behaviour
Sumichrast's vesper rat is unusual in that it is arboreal, and builds nests of twigs and leaves.

It is nocturnal and herbivorous, eating fruits and seeds, although it has been reported to eat a small number of moths. Favoured foods include figs, and the seeds of plants such as Jacquinia pungens and borage. In Costa Rica, they have also been observed to eat the poisonous leaves of the plant Daphnopsis americana, although avoiding the central part of the leaf, and selecting only young leaves. Although they move slowly when compelled to travel along the ground, and make slow deliberate movements while feeding or grooming, they are agile in the trees, moving rapidly and constantly twitching their whiskers and ears.

Under laboratory conditions, the rats remain in family groups of mated pairs, but are intolerant of any strangers, often attacking them. They have been observed to make high-pitched, musical chirps and trills, while males sometimes make lower pitched grunts towards established mates.

Reproduction
Mating occurs throughout the year. Gestation lasts from 30 to 38 days and results in the birth of one to three young. The young are reared in a nest constructed by both parents, although the male usually remains outside the nest for the first seven days after birth. They are initially blind and only partially furred, and remain attached to the mother's teats for most of their first two weeks, although they are able to crawl from two days of age. They are weaned at around three weeks, and their eyes open after fifteen to eighteen days.

The rats become sexually mature at around 75 days of age, and have lived for up to five years in captivity.

References

Clutton-Brock, Juliet (ed.). 2004. Mouse-like Rodents. pp150–159 in Animal (David Burnley ed.). London, Dorling Kindersley.

Tylomyinae
Rodents of Central America
Mammals described in 1860